WESC (660 kHz) is a commercial daytime-only classic country AM radio station licensed to Greenville, South Carolina. Owned by iHeartMedia, it serves the Upstate South Carolina region as a simulcast of WESC-FM.  The WESC studios are located in Greenville, while the station transmitter resides in nearby Berea.

The station signs off at sunset to protect clear-channel WFAN in New York City.

History

The station signed on the air in March 1947 as WESC, and for many years played country music, branded as "660 in Dixie."  In 1948, sister station WESC-FM went on the air; both stations simulcast from 1948 until the late 1960s, when WESC-FM switched to beautiful music, while WESC continued as a country outlet. WESC-FM later returned to country music. Throughout the 1970s and 80s, WESC-AM-FM were frequently the highest rated stations in the Greenville radio market.

In 1994, while simulcasting WESC-FM most of the time, WESC also picked up the nationally syndicated sports radio show, The Fabulous Sports Babe.

WESC carried its country music format until March 1, 2000, when it was purchased by Clear Channel Communications, and leased to the Radio Training Network (owners of WLFJ-FM) under a local marketing agreement (LMA). The station adopted the call sign WLFJ to match its parent station.  RTN programmed a Christian talk and teaching format, most recently branded as His Radio Talk.

In August 2019, the LMA ended, and the station returned to the WESC call letters and country music simulcast. The previous programming continues to air on WLFJ-FMHD4 and FM translator W225AZ.  As of March 28, 2020, the station’s towers were taken down for unknown reasons, possibly for a proposed subdivision. WESC was silent until January 22, 2021 and now broadcasts at 5,000 watts during the day, down from 50,000.

References

External links

ESC (AM)
Radio stations established in 1947
1947 establishments in South Carolina
Classic country radio stations in the United States
IHeartMedia radio stations
ESC